Jacques Toja (1 September 1929 – 23 March 1996) was a French actor.

Filmography

External links 
 Sa filmographie sur IMDb
 Les Archives du Spectacle
 Fondation Jacques Toja pour le Théâtre 

1929 births
1996 deaths
Deaths from cancer in France
French male stage actors
Male actors from Nice, France
Sociétaires of the Comédie-Française
Administrators of the Comédie-Française
French male film actors
French male television actors
French National Academy of Dramatic Arts alumni
20th-century French male actors